Harbidum is the name of a minor city of Sumer, located near Kish, at the Irnina canal (connecting it with Kuta). The city contained a temple dedicated to Ishara.
Harbidum is one of a cluster of settlements of which Kish was the most prominent, and which also included Garnanum and Lulhani.

References
Douglas Frayne, The Early Dynastic List of Geographical Names (1992), p. 9.

Sumerian cities
Former populated places in Iraq